Michael & Michael Have Issues (sometimes abbreviated MMHI) is a cable television comedy series starring comedians and actors Michael Ian Black and Michael Showalter, who created the series. Both comedians appeared together in several TV comedy series, including The State, and Stella. The show premiered on July 15, 2009, on Comedy Central. Showalter and Black confirmed on March 3, 2010, via their Twitter accounts that the show had been canceled.

The series starred Michael Ian Black and Michael Showalter playing fictionalized versions of themselves. As stated in a 2009 New York Times article, "Mr. Black and Mr. Showalter play the bickering stars of a sketch comedy program who never miss an opportunity to undermine each other. In between skits about stores that sell only sweatpants and characters like John the British Fork Offerer, narrative segments chronicle the not-so-fictional frenemies who constantly step on each other’s toes, even in seemingly inconsequential situations like an interview for a high school newspaper or the search for a birthday gift for their producer."

Characters
 Michael Ian Black (Michael Ian Black) – Michael plays a fictional version of himself, as well as a variety of characters.
 Michael Showalter (Michael Showalter) – Michael plays a fictional version of himself, as well as a variety of characters.
 Jim Biederman (Josh Pais) – Producer of the fictional show MMHI. Based on Jim Biederman, one of the producers of MMHI.
 Kumail (Kumail Nanjiani) – Pakistani staffer on MMHI.
 Marla Ratner (Jessi Klein) – Associate Producer of the fictional show MMHI.
 Lindsey (Susan Heyward) – Office assistant of Michael Ian Black and Michael Showalter.

Other characters
Episode one
 Greg the Intern (Matt Bennett)
 Jane (Diane Davis) – Michael Showalter's fictional girlfriend.
 Jen Biederman (Jennifer Biederman) – Biederman's wife.
 Christopher Meloni as himself
 Greg the Intern's father (Tom Daddario, comedian)

Episode two
 Nick (Leo Allen) – An editor on the show.
 Guy in office (Kumail Nanjiani)
 Newswoman (Andrea Rosen) – Newswoman on MMHI News.
 Vanessa (from the fifth floor) – Goes home from Biederman's party with Michael Showalter

Episode five
 Anna (Grace Helbig)

Other episodes
 Female Sketch Player (Arden Myrin)
 Michael Ian Black's wife (Amy Spanger)
 Pinecone Guy (Zak Orth)
 Male Sketch Player (Henry Zebrowski)
 Phyuck Yiu

Episodes

Reception
The series received a mix of good and bad reviews.  The Hartford Advocate stated that "With Michael and Michael Have Issues, they've made arguably perfect comedy for the Comedy Central audience, which is basically everyone."  
Randee Dawn of The Hollywood Reporter commented, "the Michaels have raw material in spades. Thus far, they haven't been able to harness it and make it consistently funny. For now, MMHI real issue is that it's likely to be just another in a string of missed opportunities." In the Boston Globe, Joanna Weiss wrote, "Black and Showalter work together perfectly..." and "It’s a lot to cram into a measly half-hour, but each part - and each person - makes the other one funnier." IGN gave the first season a 7/10 stating that "it was a good season but never great" and that none of the episodes truly stood out.

Soon after the show was canceled, Comedy Central began airing reruns of the first season, to which Michael Ian Black responded via his Twitter account:
"Apparently Comedy Central is airing my canceled show right now, to which I graciously say, "FUCK YOU, Comedy Central."

References

External links
 Michael & Michael have Issues at Comedy Central
 

2000s American sketch comedy television series
2009 American television series debuts
2009 American television series endings
Comedy Central original programming